Two Pages Remixed is a remix album by 4hero, released only in Japan in 1998. The album contains tracks from their previous album Two Pages remixed by other artists. Most of the tracks featured on the UK release called Two Pages Reinterpretations released the following year, though there is some differentiation between the two.

Track listing 
"We Who Are Not as Others" (Jazzanova Remix)  – 7:07
"We Who Are Not as Others (G Force & Seiji Remix)  – 7:13
"Star Chaser (Photek Remix)  – 5:57
"Starchasers" (Masters at Work Remix)  – 10:53
"The Action" (Shawn J Period Remix)  – 3:49
"Dauntless" (Restless Soul Nebula Mix)  – 6:36
"Star Chasers" (4 Hero Version Excursion)	 – 4:48
"Escape That" (Off World Remix)  – 6:41
"Escape That" (Ron Trent Remix)  – 8:57
"Planetaria" (Hefner Remix)  – 6:18
"We Who Are Not as Others" (Alpha Omega Remix)  – 6:39

4hero albums
1998 compilation albums
Electronica compilation albums
1998 remix albums
Mercury Records remix albums